Lugz is a boot and athletic brand by family-owned Jack Schwartz Shoe Company Inc., (JSSI). The brand was established in October 1993, and was aimed toward the urban fashion consumer. Lugz is sold in major retailers worldwide and offered in men's, women's and kid's styles in 93 countries.

History 

With the launch of its first boot line, Lugz gained admiration from notable people in the music and entertainment worlds, leading to many unique collaborations. One collaboration led Lugz to its first ever celebrity-endorsed, "Funk Master Flex" urban driving shoe. Then, a collaborative line with hip-hop artist, Bryan "Baby" Williams, aka "Birdman" soon followed,  in addition to other endorsers including, Snoop Dogg, Orange County Choppers, and athletes from UFC and MMA.

The popularity of the brand began to grow as radio personality Howard Stern began promoting the brand on his show.  Lugz was also appearing in music videos for artists such as B.I.G. (Biggie Smalls) and Dr. Dre; Will Smith, Jamie Foxx, NBA Basketball Players, NFL Football Players, and MLB Baseball Players were all supporting the brand by adding them to their street style. In February 2000, Lugz launched their first interactive website where consumers could finally purchase shoes online at Lugz.com.

In 2006, Orange County Choppers, signed on to endorse Lugz which seemed to be a good fit as they were already fans of the shoes. With its aggressive "built for the streets reputation", Lugz collaborated with Paul Teutul Jr. to design a signature Lugz shoe, "The Torx." Also that same year OCC and Lugz collaborated on a custom Lugz chopper. In 2009, the chopper was presented to the Bluff Poker Player of The Year.

In the fall of 2008 Lugz entered the Mixed Martial Arts scene signing its first two MMA fighters, Lyoto Machida and Houston Alexander, as endorsers. Machida captured the title of UFC Light Heavyweight Champion as he represented Lugz.  With MMA becoming a fast growing sport/entertainment platform with an increasingly growing fan base, Lugz later signed Quinton "Rampage" Jackson. In 2010, Cain Velasquez became the newest endorser of Lugz. Immediately after signing Cain, he fought to become UFC World Heavyweight Champion, and was the reigning champ in 2013.

In 2014, Lugz celebrated their 10th anniversary of Birdman's signature Lugz by releasing a new Birdman shoe in low and mid-top styles.

Lugz notable endorsers 
 Michael Hammerstone- 100% Share Holder & Brand Ambassador
 Erick Sermon
 Snoop Dogg
 Rakim
 KRS-One
 Outkast
 50 Cent
 Birdman
 Cain Velasquez - UFC Heavyweight Champion
 Orange County Choppers
 Kevin Harvick
 World Wrestling Entertainment
 Cultaholic Classic WWE SmackDown Review

References

External links 
 Lugz Official Website
 Official Twitter Page
 Official Facebook Page

1990s fashion
Shoe brands
Sportswear brands
Sporting goods manufacturers of the United States
Hip hop fashion
Boots
Shoe companies of the United States
Clothing companies established in 1993
Companies based in New York City